Maksim Mikhailovich Cheltsov (born 4 September 1970) is a former Russian professional footballer.

Club career
He made his professional debut in the Soviet Top League in 1988 for FC Torpedo Moscow.

Honours
 Soviet Top League bronze: 1988, 1991.
 Russian Cup winner: 1993.

European club competitions
With FC Torpedo Moscow.

 UEFA Cup 1991–92: 2 games.
 UEFA Cup 1992–93: 4 games.
 UEFA Cup Winners' Cup 1993–94: 4 games.

References

1970 births
Footballers from Moscow
Living people
Soviet footballers
Russian footballers
Association football defenders
Soviet Top League players
Russian Premier League players
FC Torpedo Moscow players
FC Torpedo-2 players
FC Moscow players